Brood sow may refer to the following:

a female pig used for breeding
a pejorative term for a child-rearing woman, along similar lines to 'breeder'